The 1968 Limerick Senior Hurling Championship was the 74th staging of the Limerick Senior Hurling Championship since its establishment by the Limerick County Board in 1887.

Kilmallock were the defending champions.

On 29 September 1968, Claughaun won the championship after a 2-09 to 2-05 defeat of Adare in the final. It was their eighth championship title overall and their first championship title in ten years.

Results

Final

References

Limerick Senior Hurling Championship
Limerick Senior Hurling Championship